Beacons of Ancestorship  is the sixth studio album by American post-rock band Tortoise. It was released on Thrill Jockey in 2009.

Track listing

Charts

References

External links 
 

2009 albums
Tortoise (band) albums
Thrill Jockey albums